The Davignon report, also referred to as the Luxembourg report, published on 27 October 1970, was a report on the future foreign policy of European Economic Community member nations. It was written by a council chaired by Étienne Davignon of the Belgian Foreign Office. The committee was appointed by the Council of the European Communities to make proposals on political cooperation between the member states. It recommended that member states should try to speak with a single voice on international problems, a proposal that was approved by all six member governments. It resulted first in European Political Cooperation and later in the European Union's Common Foreign and Security Policy in 1992.

See also
 History of the European Union

External links
History of the European Union, 1970 at Europa, the portal of the European Union

Publications of the European Union establishments
History of the European Union